The Yarra Yarra Golf Club is a private golf club in Australia, located in Victoria at Bentleigh East, a suburb southeast of Melbourne. It is one of the eight Melbourne Sandbelt championship courses and is renowned for its par-3s.

It has hosted the Women's Australian Open seven times as well as several editions of the Victorian Open. The club was formed in 1898 and the current course opened  in 1929; it is named for the Yarra River.

In the 1970s the club professional was Geoff Parslow. In 1977 he won the Victorian Open when it was held at Yarra Yarra. His surprise victory garnered much media attention; he defeated some of the world's best, including Greg Norman and Johnny Miller.

Tournaments hosted 
1952 Ampol Tournament (Nov.)
1954 Ampol Tournament (Nov.)
1956 Ampol Tournament
1959 Victorian Open
1965 Dunlop International
 1967 Victorian Open
1969 Dunlop International
1972 Dunlop International
 1973 Victorian Open
 1977 Victorian Open
 1977 Australian PGA Championship
 1985 Victorian Open
 1986 Victorian Open
1995 Women's Australian Open
1996 Women's Australian Open
1997 Women's Australian Open
1998 Women's Australian Open
2000 Women's Australian Open
2001 Women's Australian Open
2002 Women's Australian Open
2017 Australian Amateur

References

External links

Great Golf Australia – Yarra Yarra Golf Club

Golf clubs and courses in Victoria (Australia)
Sports venues in Melbourne
Sport in the City of Glen Eira
Buildings and structures in the City of Glen Eira